Velimirović (Cyrillic script: Велимировић) is a South Slavic surname, means "son of Velimir", may refer to:
Dragoljub Velimirović
Milan Velimirović
Miloš Velimirović
Nikolaj Velimirović
Petar Velimirović
Pavle Velimirović
Ranka Velimirović
Zdravko Velimirović

See also
Velimir

Serbian surnames
Patronymic surnames
Surnames from given names